John Russell Linford (born 6 December 1957) is an English former footballer who played in England for Gorleston, Ipswich Town, Colchester United, Southend United and Birmingham City, in the Netherlands for Fortuna Sittard, NAC Breda, FC Utrecht, Go Ahead Eagles, FC Dordrecht and ADO Den Haag, and in Switzerland for FC Zürich.

References
Player profile at Pride of Anglia

1957 births
Living people
English footballers
English expatriate footballers
NAC Breda players
Fortuna Sittard players
Go Ahead Eagles players
FC Dordrecht players
FC Utrecht players
ADO Den Haag players
Gorleston F.C. players
Ipswich Town F.C. players
Colchester United F.C. players
Southend United F.C. players
Birmingham City F.C. players
FC Zürich players
Eredivisie players
Expatriate footballers in the Netherlands
Expatriate footballers in Switzerland
English expatriate sportspeople in the Netherlands
English expatriate sportspeople in Switzerland
Footballers from Norwich
Association football forwards